Sniti Mishra is an Indian singer. She is a trained vocalist in Hindustani classical music who appeared for the first time in Zee TV musical reality show, Sa Re Ga Ma Pa Singing Superstar. She had been associated with Indo-Swedish Fusion jazz band Mynta. She has also worked with the percussionist Sivamani and Grammy Award- nominated jazz musician-keyboardist Louis Banks. She has performed classical and fusion concerts in India and worldwide. She was honored with 'Baji Rout Samman' for the year 2016 by Utkala Cultural Association, IIT Bombay.Sniti has her formal education in Economics and pursued her MBA.

During her musical tour to USA, she was invited to judge the Chicago Indian Icon and in September 2013, she was chosen as a Good Will Ambassador for a global charity Combat Blindness International.

Mishra has lent her voice for the Bollywood movie Babloo Happy Hai directed by Nila Madhab Panda. Also she has lent her voice for a Tamil movie Maaveeran Kittu under the music composition of D. Imman. Mishra has earned fame and became a household name in Kashmir for singing many Kashmiri songs. Her latest kashmiri folk song "Harmukh Bartal" is taken by the popular webseries The Family Man (Indian TV series) starred Manoj Bajpayee.

Early life
Sniti Mishra was born and raised in Balangir, a district in the western part of Odisha, into an Odia Brahmin family. She is the younger of two children.

Mishra received her Hindustani Classical training from Guru Shri Raghunath Sahoo, a disciple of Dr. Damodar Hota of the Gwalior Gharana, and studied music (Visharad) at Gandharv Music University, Mumbai. She also studied for a master's degree in Business Administration in Finance and Control (FC) from the Institute of Management and Information Science, Bhubaneswar, graduating in 2012.

References

External links

Orissapost.com 
Indiapost.com 
Newindiaexpress.com
Bkhush.com
Orissalinks.com
Telegraphindia.com
Chicagoindianicon.com

Living people
People from Balangir
Indian women classical singers
Women musicians from Odisha
Singers from Odisha
Hindustani singers
Women Hindustani musicians
Hindi-language singers
Urdu-language singers
Year of birth missing (living people)
21st-century Indian singers
21st-century Indian women singers